The Accademia di Agricoltura di Torino (academy of agriculture) of Turin was founded as the Società Agraria di Torino on 24 May 1785, by edict of Victor Amadeus III, King of Sardinia,
 
The organisation was later granted royal status, becoming the Reale Società Agraria, and today is known as the Accademia di Agricoltura di Torino (Turin Academy of Agriculture).

The impetus to establish the society came from the aristocratic landowners of Piedmont who  provided its leadership. During this period they were anxious to embrace the results of scientific research into new and more productive farming methods in order to maximise the profitability of their estates. This they achieved through such means as developing the network of irrigation canals, extending the cultivation of rice, introducing new animal breeds, and establishing new business arrangements: sharecropping was replaced by large-scale leasing agreements.

References

External links
 The web site of the Turin Academy of Agriculture.

External links
 ‘Storia Accademia di Agricoltura di Torino’, istituticulturali.it.

Organizations established in 1785
Kingdom of Sardinia
History of Turin
Agricultural organisations based in Italy
Learned societies of Italy
1785 establishments in Italy
1785 establishments in the Kingdom of Sardinia